Ysaline Bonaventure (born 29 August 1994) is a Belgian professional tennis player.

Bonaventure has won two doubles titles on the WTA Tour, as well as 12 singles and 14 doubles titles on the ITF Women's Circuit. On 6 March, she reached her best singles ranking of world No. 84. On 1 February 2016, she peaked at No. 57 in the doubles rankings.

Playing for Belgium Fed Cup team, Bonaventure has a win–loss record of 9–5. She was selected for the Fed Cup team for the first time in 2012 when she played a doubles match alongside Alison Van Uytvanck in the World Group Play-offs.

Career

2015-16: Two WTA titles and top 60 in doubles  
Bonaventure lost in the first round of qualifying at the 2015 Australian Open and French Open. At the 2015 Wimbledon Championships, she also lost in the first round of qualifying, beaten in three sets by Michelle Larcher de Brito. She reached the third round of qualifying at the US Open of that year.

She won two WTA Tour doubles titles that year, showing her ability in doubles, her focus slowly shifting towards singles after 2015. She subsequently reached a career-high ranking in doubles of No. 57 in February 2016.

2018-20: Top 150, Grand Slam debut
She lost again in the third and final round of qualifying at Roland Garros in 2018, before making her Grand Slam main-draw debut in 2019, at the Australian Open and then at Wimbledon.
She also reached as a qualifier the quarterfinals in Rabat where she lost to compatriot Alison Van Uytvanck, and the third round in Indian Wells where she defeated wildcard Taylor Townsend and 28th seed Donna Vekic before losing to Karolina Pliskova

In 2020, she finally won a match in the main draw of a Grand Slam tournament at the US Open in New York.

2022: Top 100
At the French Open, she qualified to make her debut at this major thus finally completing the set of main-draw appearances at all four Grand Slam tournaments.

She reached the top 100 on 31 October 2022, at world No. 94.

2023: First WTA semifinal 
At the Auckland Open she reached as a qualifier her first WTA career semifinal defeating eight seed Rebecca Marino and third seed Leylah Fernandez.
She reached her second quarterfinal of the season at the 2023 Monterrey Open with a win over qualifiers Despina Papamichail and Kamilla Rakhimova. She lost to eventual champion Donna Vekic in three sets. She reached a new career high of world No. 84 on 6 March 2023.

Performance timelines

Only main-draw results in WTA Tour, Grand Slam tournaments, Fed Cup/Billie Jean King Cup and Olympic Games are included in win–loss records.

Singles
Current after the 2023 Indian Wells Open.

Doubles

WTA career finals

Doubles: 2 (2 titles)

ITF Circuit finals

Singles: 25 (12 titles, 13 runner–ups)

Doubles: 20 (14 titles, 6 runner–ups)

Notes

References

External links

 
 
 

1994 births
Living people
Belgian female tennis players
Sportspeople from Liège
Walloon sportspeople
21st-century Belgian women